Aixa Salvador García (born 12 October 2001) is a Spanish footballer who plays as a forward for Villarreal.

Club career
Salvador started her career at Villarreal B. She was only 13 when she started playing for Villarreal B and was promoted to the senior Villarreal team at the age of 14.

References

External links
Profile at La Liga

2001 births
Living people
Women's association football forwards
Spanish women's footballers
Sportspeople from Castellón de la Plana
Footballers from the Valencian Community
Villarreal CF (women) players
Real Betis Féminas players
Primera División (women) players
Segunda Federación (women) players
EdF Logroño players
Primera Federación (women) players